Samuel Luke Johnstone (born 25 March 1993) is an English professional footballer who plays as goalkeeper for  club Crystal Palace and the England national team.

A product of the Manchester United academy, Johnstone spent time on loan with Oldham Athletic, Scunthorpe United, Walsall, Yeovil Town, Doncaster Rovers, Preston North End and Aston Villa. He was an England youth international, winning caps at under-16, under-17, under-19 and under-20 levels.

Club career

Manchester United

Early career
Johnstone joined Manchester United at academy level from Chorley-based club Euxton Villa, after being spotted by club scout Colin Fairhurst. In the 2010–11 season, he was first-choice goalkeeper in the academy, after sharing the duties the previous season.

On 26 July 2011, Johnstone joined League One club Oldham Athletic on loan, as both of their first-choice goalkeepers were sidelined by injury. On 9 September, Johnstone joined League One club Scunthorpe United on a one-month loan after their first-choice goalkeeper Josh Lillis suffered a long-term injury. The following day, he made his debut in a 1–1 home draw against Sheffield United. On 19 October, Johnstone dislocated his finger during a training session, forcing Scunthorpe to search for an emergency goalkeeper once again. On 10 November, Scunthorpe extended the loan until 9 December, which was then extended to 10 January 2012.

On 20 March 2013, Manchester United agreed for Johnstone to spend the rest of the 2012–13 season on loan to League One club Walsall. He kept consecutive clean sheets in his first few matches and was first-choice goalkeeper during his loan. On 17 August, Johnstone was loaned to Championship club Yeovil Town for a period of three months. Johnstone made his debut on the same day in a 2–0 loss to Burnley, but it was later confirmed that he had suffered a finger injury prior to his debut and returned to Manchester United for treatment.

2014–2017
On 31 January 2014, Johnstone was loaned to Championship club Doncaster Rovers for four weeks. With the first-choice goalkeeper Ross Turnbull injured, Johnstone made his debut the following day at the Keepmoat against Middlesbrough. On 4 April, Johnstone agreed a loan extension until the end of the 2013–14 season. On 27 October, Johnstone again joined Doncaster Rovers, with the club now in League One, on loan, initially until January 2015.

On 12 January 2015, Johnstone joined his hometown club, Preston North End of League One, on loan until the end of the 2014–15 season. On 25 May, Johnstone kept a clean sheet in the 2015 League One play-off final as Preston won promotion to the Championship with a 4–0 win over Swindon Town at Wembley Stadium. On Manchester United's pre-season tour of the United States in July 2015, Johnstone played as second-choice goalkeeper ahead of Anders Lindegaard, covering for David de Gea while the Spaniard recovered from a knock. He started in the victories over Club América and San Jose Earthquakes (playing the entire game) and came on as a second-half substitute against Barcelona in a 3–1 victory.

After rumours of De Gea's potential transfer Real Madrid caused the Spaniard to be dropped from the Manchester United squad, Johnstone was named on the bench behind Sergio Romero for the first game of the season against Tottenham Hotspur. After De Gea returned to the United first-team, following the collapse of his move, Johnstone failed to make the bench again in 2015.

On 31 December 2015, he re-signed for Preston on an initial 28-day loan, after Sunderland recalled Jordan Pickford on the same day. He made his first appearance of his second stint at Preston in a 2–1 home win over Rotherham United on 2 January 2016.

On 16 October 2016, Johnstone extended his contract at Manchester United until June 2018.

Loan to Aston Villa
On 5 January 2017, Johnstone joined Championship club Aston Villa on loan until the end of the 2016–17 season. He made his debut on 8 January 2017, in an FA Cup match against Tottenham Hotspur at White Hart Lane. During the period of this loan spell, he kept more clean sheets in the Championship than any other goalkeeper. In July 2017, he returned to Aston Villa on a loan deal until the end of the 2017–18 season.

West Bromwich Albion
On 3 July 2018, Johnstone signed a four-year contract with newly relegated Championship club West Bromwich Albion, for a transfer fee reported by BBC Sport to be an initial £6.5 million. He was part of the West Brom team that lost to Aston Villa in the EFL Championship play-off semi-finals on penalties in May 2019. However, the following season, Sam Johnstone helped the club gain automatic promotion to the Premier League for the 2020–21 season. Despite some criticism from fans, Johnstone kept his place as West Brom's first-choice goalkeeper and went on to have a great season despite the club being relegated that year. Sam Johnstone produced a number of 'world class' saves throughout the season, securing vital points for the club on numerous occasions. On 15 December 2020, Johnstone produced two stoppage-time saves to deny İlkay Gündoğan and Raheem Sterling to secure a 1–1 draw for the club away at the home of future Premier League Champions, Manchester City. Johnstone also played well against former club Manchester United and reigning champions Liverpool, securing 1–1 draws against both. His fine form resulted in a trio of club awards at the end of the season, winning the Supporter's Player of the Year, Player's Player of the year and PFA Community Champion Award for his work off the field. West Brom were relegated again after the 2020–21 season, and West Ham United approached them with a £10 million offer for Johnstone, which was rejected. With the club stuck mid-table in the Championship, Johnston didn't extend his contract.

Crystal Palace
On 21 June 2022, following a season with West Brom in the Championship, Johnstone agreed to join Crystal Palace on a free transfer, with him competing with Vicente Guaita and Jack Butland for playing time.

International career

Johnstone was a part of the victorious England under-17 squad at the 2010 UEFA European Under-17 Championship. He made his debut for the England under-19 team against Slovakia in September 2010.

On 28 May 2013, he was named in the 21-man squad for England under-20s at the 2013 FIFA U-20 World Cup. He made his debut on 23 June in England's first match of the tournament, a 2–2 draw with Iraq. He played in England's three matches at the tournament as they were eliminated at the group stage.

On 18 March 2021, Johnstone received his first call-up to the England senior team when he was named in the 26-man squad for their 2022 FIFA World Cup qualifiers against San Marino, Albania and Poland. He was named in the 26-man squad for UEFA Euro 2020, along with fellow goalkeepers Jordan Pickford and Dean Henderson, and made his debut on 6 June in England's final pre-tournament friendly, a 1–0 win over Romania at the Riverside Stadium. On 1 June, Johnstone was named in the 26-man squad for the rescheduled UEFA Euro 2020.

Personal life
Johnstone was born in Preston, Lancashire. His father is Glenn Johnstone, a former professional footballer who played in the Football League for Preston North End in the early 1990s. His younger brother, Max, joined Manchester United as a youth-team player in September 2016. After a year with Sunderland under-23 team, Max joined Scottish club St Johnstone in July 2019.

Career statistics

Club

International

Honours
Preston North End
Football League One play-offs: 2015

England U17
UEFA European Under-17 Championship: 2010

England
UEFA European Championship runner-up: 2020

Individual
West Bromwich Albion Supporters' Player of the Year: 2020–21
West Bromwich Albion Players' Player of the Year: 2020–21

References
Infobox statistics
England U16: 
England U17: 
England U19: 
England U20: 

Specific

External links

Profile at the Crystal Palace F.C. website
Profile at the Football Association website

1993 births
Living people
Footballers from Preston, Lancashire
English footballers
England youth international footballers
England international footballers
Association football goalkeepers
Manchester United F.C. players
Oldham Athletic A.F.C. players
Scunthorpe United F.C. players
Walsall F.C. players
Yeovil Town F.C. players
Doncaster Rovers F.C. players
Preston North End F.C. players
Aston Villa F.C. players
West Bromwich Albion F.C. players
English Football League players
Premier League players
UEFA Euro 2020 players
Crystal Palace F.C. players